The 1988 Head Cup, also known as the 1988 Austrian Open Kitzbühel, was a men's tennis tournament played on outdoor clay courts that was part of the 1988 Nabisco Grand Prix. It was the 18th edition of the tournament and took place at the Tennis stadium Kitzbühel in Kitzbühel, Austria, from 1 August until 7 August 1988. Third-seeded Kent Carlsson won the singles title.

Finals

Singles
 Kent Carlsson defeated  Emilio Sánchez, 6–1, 6–1, 4–6, 4–6, 6–3
 It was Carlsson's 3rd singles title of the year and the 7th of his career.

Doubles
 Sergio Casal /  Emilio Sánchez defeated  Joakim Nyström /  Claudio Panatta, 6–4, 7–6

References

External links
 ITF tournament edition details

Austrian Open
Austrian Open Kitzbühel
Austrian Open